Nakatsu Dam is a gravity dam located in Tottori prefecture in Japan. The dam is used for power production. The catchment area of the dam is 19.2 km2. The dam impounds about 15  ha of land when full and can store 1375 thousand cubic meters of water. The construction of the dam was started on 1954 and completed in 1957.

References

Dams in Tottori Prefecture
1957 establishments in Japan